Sherington is a village and civil parish in the unitary authority area of the City of Milton Keynes, Buckinghamshire, England.

Toponymy 
The village name is an Old English language word, and means 'Scira's estate'.  In the Domesday Book of 1086 the village was recorded as Serintone.  The parish church is dedicated to Saint Laud.

Twin village 
The village is twinned with Sameon in France.

References

External links

Sherington Historical Society
Sherington Parish Council website
Sherington village website

Villages in Buckinghamshire
Areas of Milton Keynes
Civil parishes in Buckinghamshire